= Nand Ram Ka Tila =

Nand Ram Ka Tila (Nand Ram's Uneven Land) is an area measuring approximately 3 km by 3 km situated in the heart of city of Agra in the state of Uttar Pradesh in India. The coordinates of the area are latitude 27°10'47.71"N and longitude 78° 0'48.45"E. The area is under the administrative jurisdiction of Mantola Police Station. Sadar Bhatti is the nearest landmark, a former foundry area during the British period and known for many steel foundries where cast steel was molded into various weapons-grade spares. The area is surrounded by Mantola Road in the north and Railway Line in the south and southeast.
